Amarildo Hysenbelliu (born 23 June 1993) is an Albanian footballer who most recently played as a midfielder for Turbina Cërrik in the Albanian First Division.

References

1993 births
Living people
People from Skrapar
Association football midfielders
Albanian footballers
KF Tirana players
FC Kamza players
KF Adriatiku Mamurrasi players
KS Sopoti Librazhd players
KS Turbina Cërrik players
Kategoria Superiore players
Kategoria e Parë players
Kategoria e Dytë players
Kategoria e Tretë players